Wavrechain-sous-Faulx is a commune in the Nord department in northern France.

Heraldry

Population

See also
Communes of the Nord department

References

Wavrechainsousfaulx